The Dutch shipbuilding firm The Damen Group, designs
and manufactures a wide variety of vessels, including a range of related patrol vessels known generally as the Damen Stan Patrol vessels'''.

The Damen Stan Patrol designs' names include a four-digit code, where the first two digits are the vessel's length, in metres, and the second two digits are its width.

In the late 1990s three 41 vessels were built for service in the Dutch Antilles, and experience with those vessels informed the later designs of the 4207 and 4708.

Rather than design vessels that were strictly for naval use, the underlying Damen Stan Patrol designs do not include weapons, or a sensor suite.  The designs have been adapted for constabulary duties, and for fishery and environmental patrols.  According to Sanjay Badri-Maharaj, of the -Institute for Defence Studies and Analyses, described how adding an autocannon and military class sensor suite to the USCG's Sentinel class boosted its cost per vessel from $20 million USD to $65 million.

In recent years Damen has developed Damen Stan Patrol vessels based on their Sea Axe bow design.
The Stan 4207 design are  patrol vessels.
They are designed to carry a complement of approximately a dozen.

Different variants
 Damen Stan 2606 patrol vessel
 Damen Stan 3007 patrol vessel
 Damen Stan 3307 patrol vessel
 Damen Stan 4100 patrol vessel
 Damen Stan 4207 patrol vessel
 Damen Stan 4708 patrol vessel
 Damen Stan 5009 patrol vessel

Vessels

Vessels of this type have been supplied to, or ordered by a number of countries.  
As of December 2011 thirty five vessels had been built.
Many of the agencies that employ these vessels have them delivered without armament, or solely with small arms.  They are equipped with water cannon.  Many of the agencies that employ these vessels specified they should be equipped with stern launching ramp, capable of launching and retrieving a  pursuit craft (RHIB) while underway.  The vessels are equipped with a horizontal thruster in their bows, to aid maneuvering in tight conditions, such as mooring in crowded anchorages. The ship are well known for their sea handling capabilities and comfort. Many are powered by Caterpillar engines.

A 5009 vessel MY Ocean Warrior was also built for Sea Shepherd Conservation Society in 2015–2016.

See also
Damen Group
Holland-class offshore patrol vessel - A larger patrol vessel that can operate offshore.

References

Patrol boat classes
Damen Group